Branston is a civil parish in the district of East Staffordshire, Staffordshire, England.  The parish contains twelve listed buildings that are recorded in the National Heritage List for England.  All the listed buildings are designated at Grade II, the lowest of the three grades, which is applied to "buildings of national importance and special interest".  The parish contains the village of Branston, which is to the south of the town of Burton upon Trent, and the surrounding area.  In the village is Branston Depot, and three buildings associated with this are listed.  The Trent and Mersey Canal passes through the parish, and the listed buildings associated with this are a milepost and a footbridge.  The other listed buildings are three farmhouses, three mileposts on roads, and a war memorial.


Buildings

References

Citations

Sources

Lists of listed buildings in Staffordshire